The Jersey Shore sound is a subgenre of rock and roll popularized at the Jersey Shore on the Atlantic Ocean coast of New Jersey, United States.

The Jersey Shore sound evolved from the mixing of pre-Beatles rock and roll, rhythm and blues, doo-wop, and the urban culture of the Mid-Atlantic states.  The form has a strong Italian-American influence inasmuch as many of the form's key precursors and artists, from Frankie Valli through Bruce Springsteen, are of Italian ancestry and urban background.

Jersey Shore music shares two thematic elements with the genres of heartland rock and roots rock: A focus on the daily lives of people (in this case, those living in the stereotypically industrial society of the northeast United States, Northern and Central Jersey) and a sense of being the underdog (a theme in the genre from The Four Seasons' "Rag Doll", "Walk Like a Man", and "Big Man in Town" and through Springsteen's Dancing in the Dark).. Traditionally it also is known by its horn section.

Major artists
 Bruce Springsteen 
 Southside Johnny and the Asbury Jukes
 Looking Glass  
 Little Steven and the Disciples of Soul
 The Gaslight Anthem

Other artists
 Willy DeVille and Mink DeVille: The Willy DeVille bands of the early 1980s exhibited a pure Jersey Shore sound with accordions and a full-throated sax played by Louis Cortelezzi. Critics sometimes compared Mink DeVille's Coup de Grâce (1981) and Where Angels Fear to Tread (1983) to Springsteen and Southside Johnny. Allmusic said about Coup de Grâce, "The band's sound combined with Nitzsche's timeless production style, which combined with that voice to create a purer rock & roll noise than even Springsteen's in 1981." Allmusic said about Where Angels Fear to Tread, "Why (Mink DeVille) didn't catch and George Thorogood and Southside Johnny (briefly) did is a mystery that will be up to '80s historians to figure out."
 The Gaslight Anthem: A New Brunswick, New Jersey rock band that encompasses punk rock, blues, soul, and Americana as well as Jersey shore. They achieved the best album of 2008 awards from punknews.org and eMusic as well as high ratings from multiple sites for their album The '59 Sound.
 Salvation: was the top draw in the New Jersey nightclub scene for more than a decade from 1969 to 1981. They were the house band every summer at the Osprey Bar in Manasquan,  NJ for a record 12 years. They recorded with both United Artists and Elektra Records.  They were featured on a national live radio broadcast from the Stone Pony promoting their successful single "Overnight Success" recorded on Elektra Records. They were a 7 piece band with 3 horns and many say that they were the precursor to Southside Johnny. Their self produced album "Salvation Summer '75" has brought $500 each on Ebay for 2 separate autographed copies. The albums bring as much $100 on a regular basis on Ebay.

See also
Brown-eyed soul
Doo-wop
Rock and roll
Soul music
Heartland rock
Roots rock
Beach music

References 

 
American rock music genres
Music of New Jersey
Music scenes